Men in tights can refer to:

 Pantyhose for men, hosiery worn by men
 Robin Hood: Men in Tights, a 1993 American adventure comedy film